Kuva Kuva Vaathugal is a 1984 Indian Tamil-language film directed by Manivannan and produced by Panchu Arunachalam. The film stars Sivakumar, Sulakshana, Pandiyan and Ilavarasi. It was released on 14 January 1984.

Plot

Cast 
Sivakumar
Sulakshana
Pandiyan
Ilavarasi
Janagaraj
Manorama
Thengai Srinivasan
Mohan – Special appearance
Sasikala – Special appearance

Soundtrack 
Soundtrack was composed by Ilaiyaraaja and lyrics were written by Panchu Arunachalam.

Reception 
Jayamanmadhan of Kalki wrote .

References

External links 
 

1980s Tamil-language films
1984 films
Films directed by Manivannan
Films scored by Ilaiyaraaja